Howard Fenton (born 6 February 1952) is a Jamaican former cyclist. He competed in four events at the 1972 Summer Olympics.

References

External links
 

1952 births
Living people
Jamaican male cyclists
Commonwealth Games competitors for Jamaica
Cyclists at the 1970 British Commonwealth Games
Olympic cyclists of Jamaica
Cyclists at the 1972 Summer Olympics
Place of birth missing (living people)